Roger Barisien (born 8 December 1912, date of death unknown) was a French fencer. He competed in the team sabre event at the 1936 Summer Olympics.

References

External links
 

1912 births
Year of death missing
French male sabre fencers
Olympic fencers of France
Fencers at the 1936 Summer Olympics